The Minnesota State Junior Boys’ Golf Championship is an annual tournament conducted by the Minnesota Golf Association (MGA) to determine the state golf champion for boys less than 19 years of age. While the MGA traces the tournament back to 1924 (the 2014 event was billed as the 88th annual), the lineage to that first tournament is circuitous. Over the years, the state junior golf championship has encompassed four independently sponsored and differently named statewide tournaments with intervals during which two of the tournaments have overlapped.

The first iteration of the state junior championship was established by the MGA and conducted from 1924-1935. Known as the Minnesota Junior Golf Tournament, the first winner was Lester Bolstad. In 1931, the St. Paul Voiture of the American Legion Forty and Eight Veterans Organization sponsored a similar, if competing, statewide tournament called the Forty and Eight State Junior Golf Tournament. The two tournaments were played until 1935 after which the MGA discontinued its state championship.
 
The Forty and Eight State Junior Tournament distinguished itself from its MGA rival in that it saw greater participation – and success – among non-Minneapolis and St. Paul metro golfers. From 1934 to 1937, the tournament was won consecutively by out-state competitors. Except for the World War II years of 1943-1944 during which the tournament was not played, the Forty and Eight State Junior Tournament continued through 1945. However, in 1946, the Forty and Eight organization ended its sponsorship resulting in no state junior golf tournament for that year.

After a one-year pause, the Minnesota Junior Chamber of Commerce assumed sponsorship of the tournament. The renamed Minnesota Jaycee Junior Golf Tournament was first played in 1947. The Minnesota Jaycee Junior was different from its predecessors in that players not only competed for the state title, but also to qualify for the International Jaycee Junior Golf Tournament – one of the major junior golf tournaments at the time.

At the height of the Minnesota Jaycee Junior’s popularity and 25 years since ending the original Minnesota Junior Golf Tournament, the Minnesota Golf Association began the MGA Junior Golf Championship in 1961. The MGA Junior format included both individual and team competitions in which the best three of four scores of each round counted toward four-man team scoring. Four golfers - Ron Benson, Gary Rodin, Jon Chaffee, and Bill Israelson - won both the Minnesota Jaycee Junior and the MGA Junior.

In 1969, unable to find financial backing for the International Jaycee Junior Tournament, the U.S. Junior Chamber of Commerce ended the International. While state and local Jaycee Junior competitions continued in Minnesota, a significant draw for the state Jaycee Junior tournament was lost with the termination of the International. Consequently, by the mid-70s, the growth and expansion of the MGA Junior Golf Championship eclipsed that of the Minnesota Jaycee Junior Golf Tournament and, after the 1975 event, the state Jaycee Junior was abandoned. 

The MGA Junior Golf Championship – the surviving tournament of the four state golf championships – continues to this day. In 2002, the MGA renamed the tournament to the Minnesota State Junior Boys’ Championship and its winner represents the state of Minnesota as its junior golf champion.

Winners

Minnesota Junior Golf Tournament (1924-1935)

Forty and Eight State Junior Golf Tournament (1931-1945)

Minnesota Jaycee Junior Golf Tournament (1947-1975)

* Won in a playoff

MGA Junior Golf Championships (1961-2001)

* Won in a playoff

Minnesota State Junior Boys' Golf Championship (2002-Present)

* Won in a playoff

References

Junior golf tournaments
Amateur golf tournaments in the United States